St. Mary's Academy Historic District may refer to:

St. Mary's Academy Historic District (Monroe, Michigan), listed on the National Register of Historic Places in Monroe County, Michigan
St. Mary's Academy Historic District (Silver City, New Mexico), listed on the National Register of Historic Places in Grant County, New Mexico